The 1996 AAA Championships was an outdoor track and field competition organised by the Amateur Athletic Association (AAA), held from 14 to 16 July at Alexander Stadium in Birmingham, England. It was considered the de facto national championships for the United Kingdom.

The competition incorporated the British Olympic trials for Great Britain at the 1996 Summer Olympics, with the top two in each (Olympic) event assured of selection, provided they had attained the qualifying standard.

Medal summary

Men

Women

References

AAA Championships
AAA Championships
Athletics Outdoor
AAA Championships
Sports competitions in Birmingham, West Midlands
Athletics competitions in England